The men's 5000 metres event at the 2014 African Championships in Athletics was held on August 11 on Stade de Marrakech.

Results

References

2014 African Championships in Athletics
5000 metres at the African Championships in Athletics